Milano Strut is an album by American jazz pianist Don Pullen featuring drummer/percussionist Don Moye recorded in 1978 for the Italian Black Saint label.

Reception
The Allmusic review by Eugene Chadbourne awarded the album 4 stars stating "a set of performances, each in the 10-minute range, that are among Pullen's finest work... The pianist unleashes the earthy, even raging power he absorbed from the Charles Mingus combo and also displays a kind of compositional memory for details and nuances that will prove to be important as each piece unfolds.

Track listing
All compositions by Don Pullen
 "Conversation" - 9:10 
 "Communication" - 10:38 
 "Milano Strut" - 7:28 
 "Curve Eleven (For Giuseppi)" - 13:16
Recorded at Barigozzi Studio in Milano, Italy in December 1978

Personnel
Don Pullen - piano, organ
Don Moye - drums, percussion, congas, bells

References

Black Saint/Soul Note albums
Don Pullen albums
1978 albums